NA-173 Rahim Yar Khan-V is a constituency for the National Assembly of Pakistan.

Election 2002 

General elections were held on 10 Oct 2002. Rais Munir Ahmed of PPP won by 79,039 votes.

Election 2008 

General elections were held on 18 Feb 2008. Arshad Khan Leghari of PML-N won by 82,565 votes.

Election 2013 

General elections were held on 11 May 2013. Arshad Khan Leghari won by 80,944 votes and became the  member of National Assembly.

Election 2018 

General elections were held on 25 July 2018.

See also
NA-172 Rahim Yar Khan-IV
NA-174 Rahim Yar Khan-VI

References

External links 
Election result's official website

NA-197